Association Football Club Craigavon was an intermediate-level football club, which last played in the Intermediate A division of the Mid-Ulster Football League in Northern Ireland. The club was founded in 1978 following the amalgamation of two clubs, entered the Mid-Ulster League, and later the Mid-Ulster Intermediate League. In 1991, the club joined the Northern Amateur Football League. The club was based in Craigavon, County Armagh. In 2016, it merged with Silverwood United to form A.F.C. Silverwood.

External links
 A.F.C. Craigavon Official Club website
 Daily Mirror Mid-Ulster Football League Official website
 nifootball.co.uk – (For fixtures, results and tables of all Northern Ireland amateur football leagues)

Notes

Association football clubs established in 1978
Association football clubs disestablished in 2016
1978 establishments in Northern Ireland
2016 disestablishments in Northern Ireland
Defunct association football clubs in Northern Ireland